Ciempozuelos is a municipality in Spain located in the Community of Madrid. The municipality spans across a total area of 49.64 km2 and, as of 1 January 2020, it has a registered population of 25,104.

Geography 
The municipality is located in the watershed of the Jarama, which flows through the eastern limit of the municipality.

History 
In the middle ages, the hamlet of Ciempozuelos belonged to the land of Segovia, included in the sexmo of Valdemoro. At least since as far back in time as the 14th century, water supply was primarily performed by means of dug galleries.

The origin of the name Ciempozuelos is due to the fact that in the past, there was a channel to supply the fountain in the town square. As the spring that fed was not abundant, the town built several wells. It seems that the first permanent settlement in the municipality could be Roman, being known as Ischadia (island of Ischia, Italy), which means land of fig trees. 

In 1894 and 1895 a set of ceramics from the Campaniform culture were excavated in the municipality, a prehistoric cultural manifestation associated with the Chalcolithic and the initial period of the Bronze Age. The ceramics of Ciempozuelos were recovered during an emergency excavation carried out in two very short campaigns commissioned by the Royal Academy of History. The exact location of the site is not known, because it seems that it was razed when the road "from Cuesta de la Reina to San Martín de la Vega" was built, later called M-404. It is assumed that it was at the foot of the Cerro del Castillejo, near the current Ciempozuelos train station.

As part of the area, it was united in the Middle Ages to the council of Segovia, but no population was consolidated, until 1457 the area was definitively repopulated. A few years later, it came under the influence of the county of Chinchón. 

Constitution Plaza

Already in the 19th century, the Madrid-Aranjuez railway line was built, providing Ciempozuelos since then, with its own railway station; As an anecdote, it can be added that the test trip of this line was to this municipality days before its inauguration. In the second half of the 19th century, two psychiatric hospitals were built, one for men and one for women, by the hospital brothers of San Juan de Dios and Father Benito Menni.

References

External links

  The official site of the city 

Municipalities in the Community of Madrid